K for Kishore is an Indian television singing contest that was broadcast on Sony Entertainment Television India, from 21 December 2007, to 4 May 2008, with a four-hour grand finale. The show was created to determine which of 12 contestants, all professional and seasoned singers, was most able to sing songs 'similarly' to singer Kishore Kumar. The show featured popular judges and music directors. The series was opted for only the votes of the judges and the audience in the studio for deciding the singers who come closest to the singer Kishore Kumar.

Judges
Bappi Lahiri
Amit Kumar
Sudesh Bhonsle

Guests
Leena Chandraverkar
Asha Parekh
Kumar Sanu
Alka Yagnik
Vinod Rathod
Hema Sardesai
Javed Akhtar
Nagesh Kukunoor (extended guest)
Asha Bhonsle
Rajesh Khanna (grand finale)
Kunal Khemu
Atif Aslam

Hosts
Rajeshwari Sachdev
Babul Supriyo

First participants
Arnab Charkrabarti (Team: Jhumroos) --- Winner
Chintan Bakiwala (Team: Bangdoos) --- 1st runner-up
Chetan Rana (Team: Bangdoos) --- 2nd runner-up
Nayan Rathore (Team: Bangdoos)   -- Eliminated
Vinod Seshadri (Team: Jhumroos)  -- Eliminated 
Sameer Memon (Team: Jhumroos)    -- Eliminated 
Apurva (Team: Jhumroos)          -- Eliminated 
Pramod Rampal (Team: Jhumroos)   -- Eliminated
Harsh Vyas (Team: Jhumroos)      -- Eliminated
Milind Ingle (Team: Jhumroos)    -- Eliminated 
Suhas Sawant (Team: Bangdoos)    -- Eliminated
Kshitij Wagh (Team: Bangdoos)    -- Eliminated 
Saurabh Ghosh (Team: Bangdoos)   -- Eliminated 
Babar Chandio (Team:Chandio)     -- Eliminated

Challengers
Shailendra Kumar-winner
Amit Paul—Eliminated (due to ill health )
Amanat Ali—Eliminated 
Rex D' Souza—Eliminated 
Anil Srivastva—Eliminated  
Sikander Ali—Eliminated

References

External links
K for Kishore Official Site on SET India

Indian reality television series
Sony Entertainment Television original programming
Singing talent shows
Music competitions in India